Thomas Hancock may refer to:

Thomas Hancock (merchant) (1703–1764), Boston businessman, uncle of John Hancock
Thomas Hancock (inventor) (1786–1865), English inventor who founded the British rubber industry
Thomas Hancock (VC) (1823–1871), English recipient of the Victoria Cross